David William Leigh (born 22 December 1956) is an English former competitive swimmer.

Swimming career
Leigh represented Great Britain in the Olympics, FINA world championships and European championships, and England in the Commonwealth Games.  He competed in the 1976 Summer Olympics in Montreal, Canada.

Representing England he also competed at the 1974 British Commonwealth Games at Christchurch, New Zealand, where he beat David Wilkie to the gold medal in the 100 metres breaststroke. He also won a silver medal in the 200 metres breaststroke and a bronze medal in the medley relay. At the ASA National British Championships he won the 100 metres breaststroke title in 1975.

See also
 List of Commonwealth Games medallists in swimming (men)

References

1956 births
Living people
British male swimmers
Male breaststroke swimmers
Olympic swimmers of Great Britain
Swimmers at the 1976 Summer Olympics
World Aquatics Championships medalists in swimming
European Aquatics Championships medalists in swimming
Swimmers at the 1974 British Commonwealth Games
Commonwealth Games gold medallists for England
Commonwealth Games silver medallists for England
Commonwealth Games bronze medallists for England
Commonwealth Games medallists in swimming
Medallists at the 1974 British Commonwealth Games